Malloewia is a genus of frit flies in the family Chloropidae. There are about 8 described species in Malloewia.

Species
 Malloewia abdominalis (Becker, 1912)
 Malloewia aequa (Becker, 1912)
 Malloewia diabolus (Becker, 1912)
 Malloewia excipiens (Becker, 1912)
 Malloewia extrema (Becker, 1912)
 Malloewia neglecta (Becker, 1912)
 Malloewia nigripalpis (Malloch, 1913)
 Malloewia setulosa (Malloch, 1918)

References

Further reading

External links

 Diptera.info

Oscinellinae